Kamayo (Kinamayo or alternatively spelled Camayo), also called Kadi, Kinadi, or Mandaya, is a minor Austronesian language of the central eastern coast of Mindanao in the Philippines.

Distribution
Spoken in some areas of Surigao del Sur (the city of Bislig and the municipalities of Barobo, Hinatuan, Lingig, Tagbina, Lianga, San Agustin & Marihatag) and Davao Oriental, Kamayo varies from one municipality to another. Lingiganons are quite different from other municipalities in the way they speak the Kamayo language. Ethnologue also reports that Kamayo is spoken in the Agusan del Sur Province border areas, and in Davao Oriental Province between Lingig and Boston.

Dialects
Kamayo is a language widely used by the Mandayas in the Davao Oriental areas. It is closely related to Tandaganon and Surigaonon. Dialect variations are caused by mixed dialect communications such as the Cebuano language in barangays Mangagoy and Pob. Bislig. The towns of Barobo, Hinatuan, and Lingig has a distinct version spoken.

Kamayo dialects can be classified as North Kamayo and South Kamayo.

Vocabulary
Common phrases

See also
Languages of the Philippines

References

Mansakan languages
Languages of Surigao del Sur